In mathematics, the Fourier inversion theorem says that for many types of functions it is possible to recover a function from its Fourier transform. Intuitively it may be viewed as the statement that if we know all frequency and phase information about a wave then we may reconstruct the original wave precisely.

The theorem says that if we have a function  satisfying certain conditions, and we use the convention for the Fourier transform that 

then

In other words, the theorem says that 

This last equation is called the Fourier integral theorem.

Another way to state the theorem is that if  is the flip operator i.e. , then 

However, even under more general conditions versions of the Fourier inversion theorem hold. In these cases the integrals above may not converge in an ordinary sense.

Statement

In this section we assume that  is an integrable continuous function. Use the convention for the Fourier transform that 

Furthermore, we assume that the Fourier transform is also integrable.

Inverse Fourier transform as an integral

The most common statement of the Fourier inversion theorem is to state the inverse transform as an integral. For any integrable function  and all  set

Then for all  we have

Fourier integral theorem

The theorem can be restated as 

If  is real valued then by taking the real part of each side of the above we obtain

Inverse transform in terms of flip operator

For any function  define the flip operator  by

Then we may instead define 

Since  we have  and

Two-sided inverse

The form of the Fourier inversion theorem stated above, as is common, is that

In other words,  is a left inverse for the Fourier transform. However it is also a right inverse for the Fourier transform i.e.

Conditions on the function

When used in physics and engineering, the Fourier inversion theorem is often used under the assumption that everything "behaves nicely". In mathematics such heuristic arguments are not permitted, and the Fourier inversion theorem includes an explicit specification of what class of functions is being allowed. However, there is no "best" class of functions to consider so several variants of the Fourier inversion theorem exist, albeit with compatible conclusions.

Schwartz functions

The Fourier inversion theorem holds for all Schwartz functions (roughly speaking, smooth functions that decay quickly and whose derivatives all decay quickly). This condition has the benefit that it is an elementary direct statement about the function (as opposed to imposing a condition on its Fourier transform), and the integral that defines the Fourier transform and its inverse are absolutely integrable. This version of the theorem is used in the proof of the Fourier inversion theorem for tempered distributions (see below).

Integrable functions with integrable Fourier transform

The Fourier inversion theorem holds for all continuous functions that are absolutely integrable (i.e. ) with absolutely integrable Fourier transform. This includes all Schwartz functions, so is a strictly stronger form of the theorem than the previous one mentioned. This condition is the one used above in the statement section.

A slight variant is to drop the condition that the function  be continuous but still require that it and its Fourier transform be absolutely integrable.

Integrable functions in one dimension

 Piecewise smooth; one dimension
If the function is absolutely integrable in one dimension (i.e. ) and is piecewise smooth then a version of the Fourier inversion theorem holds. In this case we define

Then for all 

At points where  is continuous this simply equals .

A higher-dimensional analogue of this form of the theorem also holds, but according to Folland (1992) is "rather delicate and not terribly useful".

 Piecewise continuous; one dimension

If the function is absolutely integrable in one dimension (i.e. ) but merely piecewise continuous then a version of the Fourier inversion theorem still holds. In this case the integral in the inverse Fourier transform is defined with the aid of a smooth rather than a sharp cut off function; specifically we define

The conclusion of the theorem is then the same as for the piecewise smooth case discussed above.

 Continuous; any number of dimensions

If  is continuous and absolutely integrable on  then the Fourier inversion theorem still holds so long as we again define the inverse transform with a smooth cut off function i.e.  

The conclusion is now simply that for all 

 No regularity condition; any number of dimensions

The inverse transform is again defined with the smooth cut off, but with the conclusion that 

 

for almost every

Square integrable functions

In this case the Fourier transform cannot be defined directly as an integral since it may not be absolutely convergent, so it is instead defined by a density argument (see the Fourier transform article). For example, putting 

we can set  where the limit is taken in the -norm. The inverse transform may be defined by density in the same way or by defining it in terms of the Fourier transform and the flip operator. We then have

 

in the mean squared norm. In one dimension (and one dimension only), it can also be shown that it converges for almost every - this is Carleson's theorem, but is much harder to prove than convergence in the mean squared norm.

Tempered distributions

The Fourier transform may be defined on the space of tempered distributions  by duality of the Fourier transform on the space of Schwartz functions.

where  is defined using the integral formula. If  then this agrees with the usual definition. We may define the inverse transform , either by duality from the inverse transform on Schwartz functions in the same way, or by defining it in terms of the flip operator (where the flip operator is defined by duality). We then have

Relation to Fourier series

The Fourier inversion theorem is analogous to the convergence of Fourier series. In the Fourier transform case we have

In the Fourier series case we instead have

Applications

In applications of the Fourier transform the Fourier inversion theorem often plays a critical role. In many situations the basic strategy is to apply the Fourier transform, perform some operation or simplification, and then apply the inverse Fourier transform. 

More abstractly, the Fourier inversion theorem is a statement about the Fourier transform as an operator (see Fourier transform on function spaces).

Properties of inverse transform

The inverse Fourier transform is extremely similar to the original Fourier transform: as discussed above, it differs only in the application of a flip operator. For this reason the properties of the Fourier transform hold for the inverse Fourier transform, such as the Convolution theorem and the Riemann–Lebesgue lemma. 

Tables of Fourier transforms may easily be used for the inverse Fourier transform by composing the looked-up function with the flip operator. For example, looking up the Fourier transform of the rect function we see that

so the corresponding fact for the inverse transform is

Proof

 For , Fubini's theorem implies that .
 Define ; then .
 Define . Then with  denoting convolution,  is an approximation to the identity: for any continuous  and point ,  (where the convergence is pointwise).
Since, by assumption, then it follows by the dominated convergence theorem that

Define . Applying facts 1, 2 and 4, repeatedly for multiple integrals if necessary, we obtain

But since , fact 5 says that

Putting together the above we have shown that

Notes

References

 
 

Generalized functions
Theorems in Fourier analysis
Schwartz distributions